Samsara is a 2001 independent film directed and co-written by Pan Nalin. An international co-production of India, Germany, France, Italy, and Switzerland, the film tells the story of a Buddhist monk's quest to find Enlightenment. It stars Shawn Ku as the monk Tashi, and Christy Chung as Pema.

Plot
Tashi began his training as a Buddhist monk at the age of five. Twenty years later, he emerges from a three-year solitary meditation, for which he is awarded the degree of khenpo by the rinpoche. When Tashi begins to have wet dreams, his relationships at the temple become strained. On an official visit, he stays with a farmer and meets Pema, the farmer's daughter. He leaves monastic life, returning to the farm, where he joins the migrant workers for the harvest. After another encounter with Pema, they marry. They later have a son, Karma.

The ex-lama becomes a farmer and landowner, becoming financially successful by bringing the harvest to the city instead of selling to the local merchant Dawa, who cheats the local farmers. This puts him at odds with Jamayang, Pema's former fiancee and local stonemason, who resents Tashi for damaging the long-standing relationship between the people of the valley and Dawa.

Tashi is at odds with his sexuality and an attraction to Sujata, a migrant worker who returns to the farm to labor each year. While Pema goes to the city to sell their harvest, he and Sujata have sex. He's told that this was something Sujata and Pema have talked about for years. His friend from his time as a lama comes to visit, and informs Tashi that their mentor, Apo, has died. Racked with guilt over his infidelity and the death of Apo, Tashi leaves the farm to return to the monastery.

Cast 
 Shawn Ku as Tashi
 Christy Chung as Pema
 Neelesha Barthel as Sujata
 Lhakpa Tsering as Dawa
 Jamayang Jinpa as Sonam

References

External links

 

 Article on Pan Nalin Times of India

2001 films
2001 drama films
Paramount Pictures films
Sony Pictures films
Columbia Pictures films
Sony Pictures Networks India films
Italian drama films
French drama films
Films about Tibet
Films about Buddhism
Metaphysical fiction films
Tibetan-language films
Ladakhi-language films
Tibetan Buddhist art and culture
Indian independent films
Films directed by Pan Nalin
2000s French films